The 1955 Baylor Bears football team represented Baylor University in the 1955 college football season. The team finished with a record of 5-5. Henry Gremminger (End) was chosen to the All-Conference team for a second year in a row.

Schedule

References

Baylor
Baylor Bears football seasons
Baylor Bears football